This is a list of Belgian football transfers for the 2023 winter transfer window. Only transfers involving a team from the professional divisions are listed, including the 18 teams in the Belgian First Division A and the 12 teams playing in the Belgian First Division B.

The wintertransfer window opened on 1 January 2023 and towards the end of January 2023.

Note that several transfers were announced prior to the opening date. Furthermore, players without a club may join one at any time, either during or in between transfer windows. After the transfer window closes a few completed transfers might still be announced a few days later.

Transfers

References 

Belgium